The qualifying tournaments to the 2014 CONCACAF Under-20 Women's Championship, the North American continent's youth football championships started in July 2013. The qualification process was divided into the Central American and Caribbean zone. USA and Mexico, as well as hosts Cayman Islands, were automatically qualified to the final tournament.

Central America qualifying
Three teams will advance to the final tournament. The Central American Football Union set the dates for the tournament on 9 July 2013.

Group 1
Played from 21 to 25 August 2013 in Honduras.

|}

Group 2
Played from 4 to 8 September 2013 in Panama.

|}

Play-off
The two second placed teams play two matches on 17 and September 21 to determine the last team qualifying.

|}

Caribbean qualifying
Two teams advanced to the final tournament.

First round
The winner and runner-up from each group advance to the second round. There are at four groups with fifteen teams.

Group 1
Played from 9 to 13 July 2013 in the Dominican Republic.

|}

Group 2
Played from 16 to 22 July 2013 in the British Virgin Islands.

|}

Group 3
Played from 16 to 20 July 2013 in Suriname.

|}

Group 4
Played from 21 to 28 July 2013.

|}

Second round
The second round is played in November in Jamaica. The top two of each group advance to the semi-finals.

Group 1

|}

Group 2

|}

Knockout-stage

Semi-finals
Winners advance to final.

|}

Third place

|}

Final
Both teams advance to the final tournament.

|}

References

External links
Under 20s – Women, CONCACAF.com
Fútbol Femenino Sub-20, UNCAFut.com 
Women's U20, CFUfootball.org
Final round results

Qualifying
2013 in women's association football
2014 in youth sport
2014